Geiser may refer to:

 Carl Friedrich Geiser (1843–1934), Swiss mathematician
 David Geiser (born 1948), American artist
 Fabian Geiser (born 1983), Swiss footballer (i.e. soccer player)
 Geiser Manufacturing, late 19th-century and early 20th-century American manufacturing company of farm equipment
 Jeff Geiser (born 1953), American football coach
 Linda Geiser (born 1935), Swiss movie and television actress

See also 
Geyser